Conservation Fallout: Nuclear Protest at Diablo Canyon is a 2006 book by John Wills.

Widespread public opposition accompanied the rise of the U.S. nuclear industry during the 1960s and 1970s. In Conservation Fallout, Wills examines one of the most controversial nuclear projects of the period: Pacific Gas and Electric's  Diablo Canyon Power Plant, which was built in a relatively unsettled, biologically diverse, and scenic part of the central California coast. Wills bases his book on extensive interviews with the individuals involved, as well as on the archives of the Sierra Club, several protest organizations, public agencies, and PG&E.

See also

Anti-nuclear movement in California
Anti-nuclear protests in the United States
Critical Masses: Opposition to Nuclear Power in California, 1958–1978
Dark Circle
John Gofman
List of articles associated with nuclear issues in California
List of books about nuclear issues
Nuclear power in the United States
San Onofre Nuclear Generating Station

References

Anti-nuclear protests in the United States
Books about nuclear issues
Pacific Gas and Electric Company
Books about California
2006 non-fiction books